Capital Hotel may refer to:
in the United Kingdom
 Capital Hotel, London

in the United States
Capital Hotel (Little Rock, Arkansas)
Capital Hotel (Frankfort, Kentucky), historic hotel designed by Luckett & Farley
Capital Hilton, Washington, D.C.